Philip Kemball Fyson (21 January 1846, Higham, Suffolk - 30 January 1928, Sutton Valence) was an Anglican bishop of the Diocese of Hokkaido, in the Nippon Sei Ko Kai, the province of the Anglican Communion in Japan.

Philip Kemball Fyson was the son of Edward Fyson, a farmer. He was educated at King Edward VI School in Bury St Edmunds and Christ's College, Cambridge, graduating B.A. in Classics (1870) and Theology (1871). He prepared for ordination at the Church Missionary Society College, Islington. He began missionary work with the Church Missionary Society in Japan in 1874 at Yokohama, and was consecrated Bishop of Hokkaido in 1897.

Returning to England in 1908, Fyson was Vicar of Elmley Lovett, Worcestershire from 1908 until 1925.

Fyson was said to have become more fluent in Japanese than English. He translated much of the Old Testament into Japanese, and was very active in the preparation of the Japanese Prayer-Book.

References

British expatriates in Japan
1846 births
1928 deaths
Alumni of Christ's College, Cambridge
English–Japanese translators
Alumni of the Church Missionary Society College, Islington
People from Forest Heath (district)
People from Wychavon (district)
British expatriate bishops
Anglican bishops of Hokkaido